Eosentomon is a genus of proturans in the family Eosentomidae.

Species

 Eosentomon actitum Zhang, 1983
 Eosentomon adakense Bernard, 1985
 Eosentomon adami Condé, 1961
 Eosentomon affine Tuxen, 1967
 Eosentomon afrorostratum Tuxen, 1977
 Eosentomon agaeophthalmum Yin & Zhang, 1982
 Eosentomon ailaoense Imadaté, Yin & Xie, 1995
 Eosentomon alaskaense Nosek, 1977
 Eosentomon alcirae Najt & Vidal Sarmiento, 1972
 Eosentomon angolae Tuxen, 1977
 Eosentomon ankarafantsikaense Nosek, 1978
 Eosentomon antrimense Bernard, 1975
 Eosentomon aquilinum Nosek, 1980
 Eosentomon armatum Stach, 1926
 Eosentomon asahi Imadaté, 1961
 Eosentomon asakawaense Imadaté, 1961
 Eosentomon australicum Womersley, 1939
 Eosentomon bannaense Yin, Xie & Imadaté, 1995
 Eosentomon belli Yin, 1982
 Eosentomon beltrani Bonet, 1949
 Eosentomon bernardi Nosek & Kevan, 1984
 Eosentomon betschi Nosek, 1978
 Eosentomon bilapilli Chao & Chen, 1996
 Eosentomon binchuanense Yin, Xie & Imadaté, 2000
 Eosentomon bloszyki Szeptycki, 1985
 Eosentomon boedvarssoni Nosek, 1973
 Eosentomon boguslavi Szeptycki, 1977
 Eosentomon bohemicum Rusek, 1966
 Eosentomon bolivari Bonet, 1949
 Eosentomon boneti Tuxen, 1956
 Eosentomon bornemisszai Tuxen, 1967
 Eosentomon brevicorpusculum Yin, 1965
 Eosentomon brevisensorium Chao & Chen, 1996
 Eosentomon brevisetosum Tuxen, 1977
 Eosentomon bryophilum Szeptycki, 1986
 Eosentomon burahacabanicum Yin & Dallai, 1985
 Eosentomon caatingae Tuxen, 1976
 Eosentomon caddoense Tipping & Allen, 1994
 Eosentomon canadense Nosek & Kevan, 1984
 Eosentomon canarinum Szeptycki, 2004
 Eosentomon carolae Condé, 1947
 Eosentomon carpaticum Szeptycki, 1985
 Eosentomon cetium Szeptycki & Christian, 2000
 Eosentomon ceylonicum Nosek, 1976
 Eosentomon chantek Imadaté, 1965
 Eosentomon chickasawense Outten & Allen, 1989
 Eosentomon chishiaense Yin, 1965
 Eosentomon christianseni Bonet, 1950
 Eosentomon chunchengense Yin, Xie & Imadaté, 1995
 Eosentomon chuxiongense Yin, Xie & Imadaté, 1995
 Eosentomon cocqueti Condé, 1952
 Eosentomon coiffaiti Condé, 1961
 Eosentomon columbiense Tuxen, 1976
 Eosentomon commune Yin, 1965
 Eosentomon condei da Cunha, 1950
 Eosentomon convexoculi Chao & Chen, 1996
 Eosentomon copelandi Nosek, 1980
 Eosentomon coruscoculi Chao & Chen, 1996
 Eosentomon crassus Vidal Sarmiento & Najt, 1971
 Eosentomon crypticum Bernard, 1990
 Eosentomon curupira Tuxen, 1976
 Eosentomon daii Yin, 1982
 Eosentomon daliense Imadaté, Yin & Xie, 1995
 Eosentomon dawsoni Condé, 1952
 Eosentomon delicatum Gisin, 1945
 Eosentomon denisi Condé, 1947
 Eosentomon depilatum Bonet, 1950
 Eosentomon destitutum Bonet, 1949
 Eosentomon dian Yin, Xie & Imadaté, 1995
 Eosentomon dimecempodi Yin, 1990
 Eosentomon dissimile Yin, 1979
 Eosentomon dounanense Imadaté, 1994
 Eosentomon drymoetes Yin, 1982
 Eosentomon dureyi Copeland, 1964
 Eosentomon dusun Imadaté, 1965
 Eosentomon enigmaticum Szeptycki, 1986
 Eosentomon erwini Copeland, 1978
 Eosentomon ewingi Bonet, 1950
 Eosentomon fichteliense Rusek, 1988
 Eosentomon foliaceum Rusek, 1988
 Eosentomon foroiuliense Torti & Nosek, 1984
 Eosentomon francoisi Nosek, 1978
 Eosentomon funkei Rusek, 1988
 Eosentomon gabonense Tuxen, 1979
 Eosentomon gamae Aldaba, 1986
 Eosentomon gaoligongense Xie, 2000
 Eosentomon germanicum Prell, 1912
 Eosentomon gimangi Imadaté, 1965
 Eosentomon gisini Nosek, 1967
 Eosentomon gracile Tuxen, 1986
 Eosentomon gramineum Szeptycki, 1986
 Eosentomon guadalcanalense Tuxen & Imadaté, 1975
 Eosentomon guyongense Xie & Yin, 2000
 Eosentomon hainanense Yin, 1986
 Eosentomon hargrovei Bernard, 1990
 Eosentomon heatherproctorae Bernard & Guzowski, 2002
 Eosentomon hoogstraali Nosek, 1973
 Eosentomon huatingense Yin, Xie & Imadaté, 1995
 Eosentomon huetheri Nosek, 1973
 Eosentomon hunnicutti Outten & Allen, 1989
 Eosentomon hwashanense Chou & Yang, 1964
 Eosentomon hyatti Condé, 1958
 Eosentomon iban Imadaté, 1965
 Eosentomon imadatei Tuxen, 1967
 Eosentomon imbutum Imadaté, 1965
 Eosentomon indicum (Schepotieff, 1909)
 Eosentomon insularum Tuxen, 1977
 Eosentomon intermedium Tuxen, 1979
 Eosentomon iranicum Szeptycki, 1977
 Eosentomon jabanicum Berlese, 1912
 Eosentomon jinggangense Yin, 1987
 Eosentomon jinhongense Yin, 1982
 Eosentomon jinxiuense Zhang, 1984
 Eosentomon juni Imadaté, 1994
 Eosentomon kamenickiense Rusek, 1974
 Eosentomon kimum Imadaté, 1964
 Eosentomon kloomi Imadaté, 1965
 Eosentomon konsenense Imadaté, 1994
 Eosentomon kumei Imadaté & Yosii, 1959
 Eosentomon lancanicum Yin, 1982
 Eosentomon lapilloculi Chao & Chen, 1996
 Eosentomon lijiangense Xie, Yin & Imadaté, 2000
 Eosentomon lineare Yin, 1979
 Eosentomon longisquamum Szeptycki, 1986
 Eosentomon luquanense Xie, 2000
 Eosentomon lusitanicum Aldaba, 1986
 Eosentomon luxembourgense Szeptycki, 2001
 Eosentomon luzonense Imadaté, 1990
 Eosentomon maai Chao & Chen, 1996
 Eosentomon machadoi Condé, 1949
 Eosentomon macronyx Tuxen, 1986
 Eosentomon madagascariense Nosek, 1978
 Eosentomon magnum Yin & Zhang, 1982
 Eosentomon margarops Yin & Zhang, 1982
 Eosentomon mariae Szeptycki, 1986
 Eosentomon maryae Tipping & Allen, 1995
 Eosentomon massoudi Nosek, 1978
 Eosentomon matahari Imadaté, 1965
 Eosentomon maximum Tuxen, 1986
 Eosentomon maya Bonet, 1950
 Eosentomon medleri Tuxen, 1977
 Eosentomon megaglenum Yin, 1990
 Eosentomon megastigma Xie & Yin, 2000
 Eosentomon megatibiense Tipping & Allen, 1995
 Eosentomon meizotarsi Yin, 1982
 Eosentomon melanesiense Tuxen & Imadaté, 1975
 Eosentomon mexicanum Silvestri, 1909
 Eosentomon microphthalmum Tuxen, 1978
 Eosentomon minutum Nosek, 1978
 Eosentomon mirabile Szeptycki, 1984
 Eosentomon miroglenum Yin, 1981
 Eosentomon mixtum Condé, 1945
 Eosentomon mogadishense Yin & Dallai, 1985
 Eosentomon monlaense Yin, 1982
 Eosentomon montanum Copeland, 1964
 Eosentomon murphyi Imadaté, 1965
 Eosentomon mutti Nosek, 1978
 Eosentomon nanningense Yin & Zhang, 1982
 Eosentomon nayari Prabhoo, 1977
 Eosentomon nigeriense Tuxen, 1979
 Eosentomon nivoculum Yin, 1981
 Eosentomon noonadanae Tuxen & Imadaté, 1975
 Eosentomon noseki Tuxen, 1982
 Eosentomon notiale Tuxen & Imadaté, 1975
 Eosentomon novemchaetum Yin, 1965
 Eosentomon nudilabratum Bernard, 1990
 Eosentomon nuijangense Xie, 2000
 Eosentomon nupri Nakamura, 1983
 Eosentomon occidentale Szeptycki, 1985
 Eosentomon oceaniae Tuxen & Imadaté, 1975
 Eosentomon orientale Yin, 1965
 Eosentomon osageorum Bernard, 1990
 Eosentomon pacificum Imadaté & Yosii, 1959
 Eosentomon pairathi Imadaté, 1965
 Eosentomon paktai Imadaté, 1965
 Eosentomon pallidum Ewing, 1921
 Eosentomon palustre Szeptycki & Slawska, 2000
 Eosentomon paramonis Tuxen, 1976
 Eosentomon parvum Szeptycki, 1986
 Eosentomon pasohense Imadaté, 1976
 Eosentomon pastorale Szeptycki, 2001
 Eosentomon paucrum Szeptycki, 2001
 Eosentomon pelaezi Bonet, 1949
 Eosentomon penelopae Tuxen, 1977
 Eosentomon perreti Condé, 1954
 Eosentomon pinetorum Szeptycki, 1984
 Eosentomon pinkyae Arbea-Polite, 1990
 Eosentomon pinusbanksianum Bernard, 1975
 Eosentomon polonicum Szeptycki, 1985
 Eosentomon pomari Bernard, 1975
 Eosentomon posnaniense Szeptycki, 1986
 Eosentomon pratense Rusek, 1973
 Eosentomon proximum Tuxen, 1976
 Eosentomon pruni Bernard, 1975
 Eosentomon pseudowheeleri Copeland, 1964
 Eosentomon pseudoyosemitense Copeland & White, 1978
 Eosentomon puertoricoense Nosek, 1978
 Eosentomon pusillum Ewing, 1940
 Eosentomon quadridentatum Copeland, 1964
 Eosentomon quapawense Tipping & Allen, 1994
 Eosentomon rachelae Szeptycki & Broza, 2003
 Eosentomon rafalskii Szeptycki, 1985
 Eosentomon recula Bonet, 1949
 Eosentomon rehaiense Xie & Yin, 2000
 Eosentomon renatae Bernard, 1990
 Eosentomon richardi Bernard, 1990
 Eosentomon rishir Nakamura, 2004
 Eosentomon riyuetanense Nakamura, 1997
 Eosentomon romanum Nosek, 1969
 Eosentomon ruiliense Xie, 2000
 Eosentomon rusekianum Stumpp & Szeptycki, 1989
 Eosentomon saharense Condé, 1951
 Eosentomon sakura Imadaté & Yosii, 1959
 Eosentomon savannahense Bernard, 1990
 Eosentomon sawasdi Imadaté, 1965
 Eosentomon sayani Imadaté, 1965
 Eosentomon semiarmatum Denis, 1927
 Eosentomon sexsetosum Szeptycki, 1985
 Eosentomon shanghaiense Yin, 1979
 Eosentomon shanum Yin, 1992
 Eosentomon silesiacum Szeptycki, 1985
 Eosentomon silvaticum Szeptycki, 1986
 Eosentomon simile Condé, 1948
 Eosentomon snideri Bernard, 1990
 Eosentomon sociale Bernard, 1975
 Eosentomon solarzi Szeptycki, 1993
 Eosentomon solomonense Tuxen & Imadaté, 1975
 Eosentomon spanum Yin, 1986
 Eosentomon squamigerum Condé, 1961
 Eosentomon stachi Rusek, 1966
 Eosentomon stompi Szeptycki & Weiner, 1993
 Eosentomon strioculi Yin, 1982
 Eosentomon stumppi Rusek, 1988
 Eosentomon sturmi Tuxen, 1976
 Eosentomon subglabrum Condé, 1961
 Eosentomon subnudum Tuxen, 1978
 Eosentomon sudeticum Szeptycki, 1985
 Eosentomon swani Womersley, 1932
 Eosentomon taiwanense Nakamura, 1997
 Eosentomon tamurai Nakamura, 1997
 Eosentomon tankoktongi Imadaté, 1965
 Eosentomon tapiasum Nosek, 1978
 Eosentomon temannegarai Nosek, 1976
 Eosentomon tengchongense Xie & Yin, 2000
 Eosentomon tennesseense Copeland, 1964
 Eosentomon thamnooni Imadaté, 1965
 Eosentomon thibaudi Nosek, 1978
 Eosentomon toi Imadaté, 1964
 Eosentomon tokiokai Imadaté, 1964
 Eosentomon tokui Imadaté, 1974
 Eosentomon topochi Imadaté, 1964
 Eosentomon torbongsi Imadaté, 1965
 Eosentomon transitorium Berlese, 1908
 Eosentomon trivandricum Prabhoo, 1975
 Eosentomon tropicum Yin, 1986
 Eosentomon tschergense Szeptycki, 1988
 Eosentomon turneri Bonet, 1950
 Eosentomon tuxenanum Chou & Yang, 1964
 Eosentomon udagawai Imadaté, 1961
 Eosentomon udorni Imadaté, 1965
 Eosentomon ulinense Szeptycki, 1999
 Eosentomon umbrosum Szeptycki, 2001
 Eosentomon unirecessum Yin, 1979
 Eosentomon validum Condé, 1961
 Eosentomon venezuelense Glance, 1952
 Eosentomon vermiforme Ewing, 1921
 Eosentomon vermontense Nosek & Kevan, 1984
 Eosentomon vindobonense Szeptycki & Christian, 2000
 Eosentomon vulgare Szeptycki, 1984
 Eosentomon wanda Szeptycki, 1985
 Eosentomon weinerae Szeptycki, 2001
 Eosentomon westraliense Womersley, 1932
 Eosentomon wheeleri Silvestri, 1909
 Eosentomon womersleyi Bonet, 1942
 Eosentomon woroae Imadaté, 1989
 Eosentomon wygodzinskyi Bonet, 1950
 Eosentomon xenomystax Bernard, 1990
 Eosentomon xishaense Yin, 1988
 Eosentomon xueshanense Xie, Yin & Imadaté, 2000
 Eosentomon yanaka Imadaté, 1965
 Eosentomon yanshanense Yin & Zhang, 1982
 Eosentomon yezoensis Nakamura, 1983
 Eosentomon yilingense Yin & Zhang, 1982
 Eosentomon yinae Szeptycki & Imadaté, 1987
 Eosentomon yingjiangense Xie, 2000
 Eosentomon yosemitense Ewing, 1927
 Eosentomon yulongense Yin, Xie & Imadaté, 2000
 Eosentomon yunnanicum Yin, 1982
 Eosentomon zelandicum Tuxen, 1986
 Eosentomon zhanjiangense Zhang, 1983
 Eosentomon zixiensis Xie, 2000
 Eosentomon zodion Szeptycki, 1985

References